77th Brigade may refer to:

77th Brigade (People's Republic of China)
 77th Motorized Infantry Brigade (People's Republic of China)
 77th Indian Infantry Brigade (British Indian Army)
77th Brigade (United Kingdom)
 77th Combat Aviation Brigade (United States)
 77th Sustainment Brigade (United States Army)